Aleksandre Kvakhadze (born 17 August 1984), nicknamed Lesko, is a Georgian retired footballer who last played for Shevardeni-1906.

International career
On 12 September 2007 he made his international debut in a friendly game against Azerbaijan.

Personal life
His brother Giorgi Kvakhadze is also a footballer.

External links

1978 births
People from Mtskheta
Living people
Footballers from Georgia (country)
Georgia (country) international footballers
Association football central defenders
FC WIT Georgia players
FC Metalurgi Rustavi players
FC Torpedo Kutaisi players
FC Dila Gori players
Erovnuli Liga players